Michel Pollien (22 August 1937 − 15 January 2013) was a French Roman Catholic bishop.

Ordained to the priesthood in 1966, Pollien was appointed titular bishop of Pulceriopolis and auxiliary bishop of the Roman Catholic Archdiocese of Paris, France and retired in 2012.

References

1937 births
2013 deaths
French Roman Catholic titular bishops
Auxiliary bishops of Paris